Rudolpe Lawrence Daus (1854–1916) was an American architect in Brooklyn, New York City. He designed the 13th Regiment Armory in Brooklyn, now the Pamoja House for homeless men, and the Lincoln Club. He also designed several libraries. He was a Fellow of the American Institute of Architects.

Daus was born in Mexico to a German Catholic family of Jewish descent and studied in Europe before working for Richard Morris Hunt and George B. Post. He established his own firm in 1884.

Carl Westman worked at his firm. Daus died in Paris in 1916.

Works
203 - 209 Prospect Place (circa 1885) between Carlton and Vanderbilt Avenues in the Prospect Heights neighborhood of Brooklyn
13th Regiment Armory, Brooklyn
Lincoln Club (1886), 65 Putnam Avenue in Brooklyn
176 & 178 St. John's Place in Park Slope
New York and New Jersey Telephone and Telegraph building (1898) at 81 Willoughby Street (also known as 119-127 Lawrence Street) in Brooklyn on the list of New York City Designated Landmarks in Brooklyn
Manufacturers Hanover Trust building (1907)

Gallery

References
Informational notes

Citations

Further reading
Daus, Rudolphe L. (1947) Rodolphe Lawrence Daus, American architect, August 10, 1854-September 30, 1916'. New York: New York Public Library.

External links

1854 births
1916 deaths
19th-century American architects
20th-century American architects
Fellows of the American Institute of Architects
People from Brooklyn
American people of German descent
Architects from New York City
Mexican emigrants to the United States